Laishram Premjit Singh (born 1 February 2002) is an Indian professional footballer who plays as a winger for I-League club TRAU.

Club career
Born in Manipur, Singh began his career in the I-League with TRAU. He made his professional debut for the club on 22 December 2019 against Real Kashmir. Singh started and played the whole match as TRAU drew 2–2. He then scored his first professional goal for the club on 25 January 2020 against Aizawl. His 27th-minute goal was the equalizer in a 2–1 victory.

On 11 June 2020, it was announced that Singh signed with Indian Super League club Odisha.

Career statistics

Club

References

2002 births
Living people
Footballers from Manipur
Indian footballers
Association football forwards
TRAU FC players
Odisha FC players
I-League players
Indian Super League players